Gigliola da Carrara (1379–1416) was the Marchioness of Ferrara, daughter of Francesco Novello da Carrara, lord of Padua, son of Francesco I da Carrara, and Taddea d'Este.

The 13 years old Marchioness of Ferrara married the Marquis Niccolò III d'Este, son of Alberto V d'Este, in 1394 for 15 years.

She died of the plague in 1416, leaving no children. Nicholò then married Parisina Malatesta whom he condemned to death for adultery with Ugo d'Este, and then Ricciarda di Saluzzo, with whom he had his children Ercole I d'Este and Sigismondo d'Este.

See also
 Niccolò III d'Este

References 

1379 births
1416 deaths
Margraves of Italy
15th-century deaths from plague (disease)
Da Carrara family
15th-century Italian women